World Challenge is a for-profit UK provider of overseas adventure travel programs targeted at schools. The company was founded when a young army captain took a team of soldiers on a training mission to the snow-capped Hindu Kush mountain range in Pakistan in 1985. He realised that the personal development and camaraderie learned there would shape the team for years to come. World Challenge was later born from this experience in 1988, which created the school expedition industry.

The company operates in North America, Australia, Middle East, South East Asia and Europe. As a brand within the Travelopia Holdings Limited group, World Challenge is owned by the global investment firm Kohlberg Kravis Roberts.

Student-Led Expeditions of 1 to 4 weeks 
Depending on the experience selected, the students are in charge of picking the destination and activities from curated lists. They also take it in turns to lead the trip and manage the budget, to empower and develop them outside of the classroom.

Fundraising 
World Challenge encourages the students to raise as much of their expedition fees as possible, giving guidance and ideas along the way.

Journeys 1 to 2 weeks 
A newer offering from World Challenge is the Journey product focussing on global citizenship and cultural literacy. Aside from being shorter the focus is more on community engagement and some rest and relaxation activities. Students have an opportunity to live and work in a local community as well as take a look around the destination they are in.
The groups are led by local guides with leaders and teachers adding to the trip supervision.

Operations Centre 
The ops centre at World Challenge is available 24/7 365 days a year and they work hard to ensure the highest level of safety in the industry after investing £250k in that area of the business.

Incidents
In August 2001, a 17 year old student of Wycombe High School in High Wycombe, Buckinghamshire died after falling from a mountain on a World Challenge Expeditions trip to Vietnam. No enquiry was held following the student's death.

In August 2008, a group of pupils from The Skinners' School were robbed at gunpoint on a World Challenge expedition to Guatemala.

In July 2012, a 17 year old student collapsed and died of heat stroke on a World Challenge trip to the Sahara Desert in Morocco. At the subsequent inquest in 2014, the coroner said that the student's physical fitness for the trip had not been properly assessed, and that the company had made no arrangements for an ambulance with medical equipment in case of an emergency on the trip.

In July 2017 a student at the Royal Grammar School, High Wycombe, died while white-water rafting on a World Challenge trip to Ecuador. The company then suspended all white water rafting activity while an investigation took place.

In September 2019 a student with Type 1 diabetes died after becoming ill on a World Challenge trip to Vietnam. A coroner's inquest in the students home country of Australia heard that World Challenge staff and teachers from the student's school failed to recognise the seriousness of his condition and opportunities were missed for appropriate care to be provided.

References

External links 
World Challenge UK Official Website
World Challenge Australia Official Website
 World Challenge United States Official Website
World Challenge Middle East Official Website
ABS World Challenge: India 2016  A Challenger-made video summing up a month long expedition to North India

Youth organisations based in the United Kingdom
Adventure travel